Diva (formerly Diva Universal) was an English-language pay television channel in Singapore. It launched on 3 May 1995 as Hallmark Channel Asia, along with E!, and was first owned by Television Corporation of Singapore (TCS). In 2010, as part of an agreement with NBCUniversal International Networks, the channel was renamed Diva Universal in 2010 and then Diva in 2014. It closed at the end of in 2019 in anticipation of the launch of streaming service Hayu in the region.

History

Hallmark Channel Asia 
E! Entertainment Television was officially launched as Hallmark Channel Asia on 3 May 1995 as Singaporean 24-hour English high-definition entertainment pay television channel under Television Corporation of Singapore (TCS) along with E! Entertainment Television and MTV broadcast from Singapore seen throughout Southeast Asia in territories including Malaysia and Singapore.

Hallmark Channel Asia and E! Entertainment Television officially launching ceremony or grand launching based in Singapore on Wednesday, 3 May 1995 at 00:00:00am SST with officially opening ceremony by Tyra Banks along with E! Entertainment Television and MTV Southeast Asia officially sign marked international version of the American TV channel E! Entertainment which owned the American TV channel of the same name in Hollywood, Los Angeles. At the that time, Hallmark Channel Asia and E! Entertainment Television was officially opening ceremony or grand opening celebrate on air from icon locations; the Padang, Singapore and Changi Airport for Hallmark Channel Asia and E! Entertainment Television.

At the same time, Hallmark Channel Asia and E! Entertainment Television was launched on the Singapore Version. Hallmark Channel Asia and E! Entertainment Television officially opening ceremony its production facilities fully in Singapore. Popular reality shows included Oprah Winfrey's The Oprah Winfrey Show and Kim Kardashian, Khloé Kardashian and Kourtney Kardashian's Keeping Up with the Kardashians.

Diva Universal 
Hallmark Channel Asia was officially rebranded becomes Diva Universal on 19 September 2010 after its brand licensing agreement with Crown Media closure as part of NBCUniversal and NBCUniversal International Networks's efforts to refocus its network portfolio. Coinciding with the officially launched of its high-definition feed along with the SD channel officially opened broadcasting in high-definition on 1 February 2014.

Diva 
On 16 June 2014, Diva Universal was officially simplified becomes Diva.

On 14 March 2018, Diva on Astro officially shift and switch to HD format and the HD version of Diva HD officially opening on 16 October 2019.

On 14 March 2018, The SD version of the channel on Astro switch to HD format.

Closing Night
As part of a restructuring at NBCUniversal International Networks and as preparation of formal full grand launched of Hayu in Asia was officially opening ceremony on New Year's Day (1 January) 2020 at midnight stroke, E! Entertainment Television and Diva officially ceased broadcast and transmission after very final and last programme and very final and last British-American film usually British-American romantic time travel film title as About Time is a 2013 British-American film written and directed by Richard Curtis and starring Domhnall Gleeson, Rachel McAdams and Bill Nighy was production company by Universal Pictures officially the end after officially closing ceremony was held at Universal Studios Singapore, station ident/logo of DIVA Be Yourself and finally national anthem was played with Singapore English/Singlish translated because due very final and last time say farewell was broadcast the end all operations on very final and last night of 2010s and 2019 marked New Year's Eve 2019 (Farewell 2010s and 2019) at 11:59:59pm. The very final and last were:
Very final and last television programme: About Time is a 2013 British-American film written and directed by Richard Curtis and starring Domhnall Gleeson, Rachel McAdams and Bill Nighy was production company by Universal Pictures officially the end after officially closing ceremony was held at Universal Studios Singapore
Very final and last British-American film: About Time is a 2013 British-American film written and directed by Richard Curtis and starring Domhnall Gleeson, Rachel McAdams and Bill Nighy was production company by Universal Pictures officially the end after officially closing ceremony was held at Universal Studios Singapore
Very final and last British-American romantic time travel film: About Time is a 2013 British-American film written and directed by Richard Curtis and starring Domhnall Gleeson, Rachel McAdams and Bill Nighy was production company by Universal Pictures officially the end after officially closing ceremony was held at Universal Studios Singapore
Very final and last television station ident/logo: DIVA Be Yourself
Very final and last television music videos: National anthem was played with Singapore English/Singlish translated

Officially closing ceremony of Diva was officially screen cuts to black slow version two minutes as closing scenes on television switch off to screen cuts to ceased broadcast and ceased transmission on final last the end farewell on-screen message card words "THIS CHANNEL HAS BEEN CEASED BROADCAST. PLEASE CONTACT YOUR SERVICE PROVIDER FOR DETAILS" was officially ceased broadcasts the end so all Diva shows officially shift and moved to officially replaced by CNBC Asia to all Diva shows officially shift and moved to officially replaced by return back restore handover to same channel on very first and begin start day of 2020s and 2020 marked New Year's Day 2020 (Hello Welcome New Decade/2020s and 2020) at midnight stroke. NBCUniversal channels in Asia only remain DreamWorks, CNBC Asia and Golf Channel.

Former operating channels
 Diva Asia - Singapore/Kuala Lumpur/Jakarta feed available on SD format.
 Diva Asia HD - same as the Asian feed available in Singapore and Malaysia.

See also
 Diva Universal in various countries

References

External links
 

Television channels and stations established in 1995
Television channels and stations disestablished in 2019
Infotainment
English-language television stations
Television in Singapore
Broadcasting in Singapore
Mass media in Singapore
Mass media in Southeast Asia
1995 establishments in Singapore
2019 disestablishments in Singapore
Television stations in Singapore
Defunct television channels